Mister, abbreviated as Mr., is a common English language honorific.

Mister may also refer to:

 "Mister" (song), a song by South Korean girl group Kara
 "Mr." (Yoasobi song), a song by Japanese duo Yoasobi
 Mister (film), a 2017 Telugu film
 Mr. (artist) (born 1969), Japanese contemporary artist
 Mr. (band), Hong Kong pop rock band, or their 2008 EP, Mister
 MiSTer, a collaborative open source project to implement various retro video games systems on a FPGA

See also
 
 
 Mr. Mister (disambiguation)
 Meister
 Master (disambiguation)
 Mist (disambiguation)
 MR (disambiguation)
 Evaporative cooler, or misting system

fr:Seigneurie#Le seigneur
lmo:Sciur